Creeping cedar may refer to the following plants:

 Juniperus horizontalis in family Cupressaceae
 The genus Diphasiastrum in family Lycopodiaceae